Dion Taljard (born 7 January 1970) is a South African former cricketer. He played twenty-five first-class cricket matches for Border between 1993 and 2000. In September 2017, he was sentenced to 18 years in jail, after being convicted on 19 counts of rape, two of indecent assault and one of witness intimidation.

References

External links
 

1970 births
21st-century South African criminals
Living people
People convicted of indecent assault
South African people convicted of rape
Prisoners and detainees of South Africa
South African cricketers
Border cricketers